Josef Trousil (born 2 February 1935 in Městečko) is a Czech former sprinter who competed in the 1956 Summer Olympics, in the 1960 Summer Olympics, and in the 1964 Summer Olympics. Between 1956 and 1967, he became a national champion in 400 metres and 4 × 400 metres relay disciplines multiple times.

References

1935 births
Living people
Czech male sprinters
Olympic athletes of Czechoslovakia
Athletes (track and field) at the 1956 Summer Olympics
Athletes (track and field) at the 1960 Summer Olympics
Athletes (track and field) at the 1964 Summer Olympics
Universiade medalists in athletics (track and field)
Universiade gold medalists for Czechoslovakia
People from Rakovník District
Medalists at the 1961 Summer Universiade
Sportspeople from the Central Bohemian Region